The Palazzo dei Normanni (Norman Palace) is also called Royal Palace of Palermo. It was the seat of the Kings of Sicily with the Hauteville dynasty and served afterwards as the main seat of power for the subsequent rulers of Sicily. Since 1946 it has been the seat of the  Sicilian Regional Assembly. The building is the oldest royal residence in Europe; and was the private residence of the rulers of the Kingdom of Sicily and the imperial seat of Frederick II and Conrad IV.

History

The palace stands in the highest point of the ancient centre of the city, just above the first Punic settlements, whose remains can still be found in the basement.

The first building was a norman castle. After the Normans conquered Sicily in 1072 (just 6 years after they conquered England) and established Palermo as the capital of the new County of Sicily, the palace was chosen as the main residence of the kings. In 1132 King Roger II added the famous Cappella Palatina to the complex.

During the reign of the Swabian emperors, the palace maintained its administrative functions, and was the centre of the Sicilian School of poetry, but was seldom used as permanent seat of power, especially during the reign of Frederick II.

The Angevin and Aragonese kings preferred other seats. The palace returned to an important administrative role in the second half of the sixteenth century, when the Spanish viceroys chose it as their official residence, carrying out important reconstructions, aimed at their representative needs and their military ones, with the creation of a system of bastions.

The Spanish Bourbons built additional reception rooms (la Sala Rossa, la Sala Gialla e la Sala Verde) and reconstructed the Sala d'Ercole, named for its frescos depicted the mythological hero, Hercules.

From 1946, the palace was the seat of the Sicilian Regional Assembly. The west wing (with the Porta Nuova) was assigned to the Italian Army and is the seat of the Southern Military Region.

During the sixties, it received comprehensive restorations under the direction of Rosario La Duca.

The palace is also the seat of the Astronomical Observatory of Palermo.

The palace contains the Cappella Palatina, by far the best example of the so-called Arab-Norman-Byzantine style that prevailed in the 12th-century Sicily. The wonderful mosaics, the wooden roof, elaborately fretted and painted, and the marble incrustation of the lower part of the walls and the floor are very fine. Of the palace itself the greater part was rebuilt and added in Aragonese times, but there are some other parts of Roger's work left, specially the hall called Sala Normanna.

See also
Arab-Norman Palermo and the Cathedral Churches of Cefalù and Monreale
Cathedral of Monreale
Cathedral of Cefalù

References

External links 

 Illustrations of the Cappella Palatina
Official site

Arab-Norman Palermo and the Cathedral Churches of Cefalù and Monreale
Royal residences in the Kingdom of Sicily
Buildings and structures completed in the 9th century
Buildings and structures completed in the 12th century
Normanni
Arab-Norman architecture in Palermo
Romanesque palaces
Norman architecture in Italy
World Heritage Sites in Italy